The HIW Internet Championship is one of two secondary championships in High Impact Wrestling Canada and defended on that brand.  The current champion is Brayden Parsons who is in his first reign.

After High Impact Wrestling unveiled a new HIW Central Canadian Heavyweight Championship belt, some time later (date unknown), Charles T. Champ took the old belt and turned into the Internet Championship by putting WWW on it.  Charles declared himself the champion although unofficial.  Champ kept lobbying then CEO Gabriel Jaxxsyn to sanction the title to no avail.  When other HIW stars started challenging for the belt, HIW management declared it would become a sanctioned title.  The first official champion was decided at the Spring Meltdown 2018.  Davey O'Doyle defeated Champ in a ladder match to become the first official champion.  The title was deactivated on October 26, 2019 as Monster Brawl VI was HIW's final show as they ceased operations.  Canadian's Wrestling Elite acquired all of HIW's assets.

Title history

|}

Combined reigns

References

Internet
Television wrestling championships